Bilaspur district may refer to either of these districts of India:

 Bilaspur district, Chhattisgarh
 Bilaspur district, Himachal Pradesh

District name disambiguation pages